The World of Late Antiquity is a 1971 book by historian Peter Brown. The book was one of the first in the anglophone world to consider late antiquity as a distinct historical era. In 2014, the Folio Society republished an illustrated edition, with an introduction by historian Christopher Kelly.

References

1971 non-fiction books
Works about classical antiquity